Jaroslav Nikodým (born 14 March 1950) is a Czech judoka. He competed in the men's half-heavyweight event at the 1980 Summer Olympics.

References

External links
 

1950 births
Living people
People from Pelhřimov District
Czech male judoka
Olympic judoka of Czechoslovakia
Judoka at the 1980 Summer Olympics
Sportspeople from the Vysočina Region